Tatinga thibetana is only species in the butterfly genus Tatinga of the family Nymphalidae found in Asia.

Subspecies
Tatinga thibetana thibetana
Tatinga thibetana menpa (Yoshino, 1998) (eastern Tibet)
Tatinga thibetana tonpa (Yoshino, 1998) (northern Yunnan)

References

Satyrini
Monotypic butterfly genera
Taxa named by Frederic Moore